The Great Wagon Road was an improved trail through the Great Appalachian Valley from Pennsylvania to North Carolina, and from there to Georgia in colonial America.

Introduction

The heavily traveled Great Wagon Road was the primary route for the early settlement of the Southern United States, particularly the "backcountry". Although a wide variety of settlers traveled southward on the road, two dominant cultures emerged. The German Palatines and Scotch-Irish immigrants arrived in huge numbers because of bloody religious conflicts and persecution of Protestants by monarchies in Great Britain and Europe. The mostly Protestant German Palatines (also known as Pennsylvania Dutch) tended to find rich farmland and work it zealously to become stable and prosperous. The other group, mostly Protestant Presbyterians known as Scotch-Irish) tended to be restless, clannish, fiercely independent, and hosted a centuries old animosity to the British Crown. The Scotch-Irish made up a substantial portion of the Continental Army and the state militia in the American War of Independence. They went on to form what be the backbone of Appalachian Culture. Partly because of the language difference, the two groups tended to keep to themselves.

Beginning at the port of Philadelphia, where many immigrants entered the colonies, the Great Wagon Road passed through the towns of Lancaster and York in southeastern Pennsylvania.

Turning southwest, the road crossed the Potomac River and entered the Shenandoah Valley near present-day Martinsburg, West Virginia. It continued south in the valley via the Great Warriors' Trail (also called the Indian Road), which was established by centuries of Indian travel over ancient trails created by migrating buffalo herds. The Shenandoah portion of the road is also known as the Valley Pike. The Treaty of Lancaster in 1744 had established colonists' rights to settle along the Indian Road. Although traffic on the road increased dramatically after 1744, it was reduced to a trickle during the French and Indian War (Seven Years' War) from 1756 to 1763. But after the war ended, it was said to be the most heavily traveled main road in America.

South of the Shenandoah Valley, the road reached the Roanoke River at the town of Big Lick (today, Roanoke). South of Roanoke, the Great Wagon Road was also called the Carolina Road. At Roanoke, a road forked southwest, leading into the upper New River Valley and on to the Holston River in the upper Tennessee Valley. From there, the Wilderness Road led into Kentucky, ending at the Ohio River where flatboats were available for further travel into the Midwest and even to New Orleans.

From Big Lick/Roanoke, after 1748, the Great Wagon Road passed through the Maggoty Gap (also called Maggodee) to the east side of the Blue Ridge Mountains. Continuing south through the Piedmont region, it passed through the present-day North Carolina towns of Winston-Salem, Salisbury, and Charlotte, and sites of earlier Indian settlements on the historic Indian Trading Path.

Despite its current name, the southern part of this road was by no means passable by wagons until later colonial times. The 1751 Fry-Jefferson map on this page notes the term "Waggon" only north of Winchester, Virginia. In 1753, a group of wagon travelers reported that "the good road ended at Augusta" (now Staunton, Virginia), although they did keep going all the way to Winston-Salem. By all accounts, it was never a comfortable route. The lines of settlers' covered wagons moving south were matched by a line of wagons full of agricultural produce heading north to urban markets; these were interspersed with enormous herds of cattle, hogs, and other livestock being driven north to market. Although there surely would have been pleasant areas for travel, road conditions also could vary from deep mud to thick dust, mixed with animal waste. In general, travelers preferred high and dry roads, but they also needed regularly spaced water sources for their horses (and for themselves). Inns were generally built near flowing springs, but provided only the most basic food and a space to sleep.

Today, it is possible to experience many segments of the old road by car, by bike, or even on foot. Although most of the road has seen profound changes, some areas retain scenery much as the pioneers encountered it.

Summary
The following tables summarize the segments of the Great Wagon Road, with links to details on each section and a Google map showing the current roads and a satellite view of the area.

Note:  The segments and distances are approximations; actual paths varied constantly with fallen trees, floods, etc.

Philadelphia to York, Pennsylvania

York, Pennsylvania to Winchester, Virginia via Old Monocacy Road
Continuing west at York, Pennsylvania:

York, Pennsylvania to Winchester, Virginia via Nichols Gap
Continuing west at York, Pennsylvania:

York, Pennsylvania to Winchester, Virginia via Black's Gap
Continuing west at York, Pennsylvania:

Winchester to Roanoke, Virginia
Continuing south at Winchester, Virginia:

Roanoke, Virginia to Wachovia, North Carolina
Continue south at Roanoke, Virginia:

Wachovia to Salisbury, North Carolina via the Trading Ford
Continue south at Wachovia, North Carolina:

Wachovia to Salisbury, North Carolina via the Shallow Ford
Continue south at Wachovia, North Carolina:

Salisbury, North Carolina to Charlotte, North Carolina
Continue south at Salisbury, North Carolina:

Charlotte, North Carolina to Augusta, Georgia via Camden and Columbia, South Carolina
Continue south at Charlotte, North Carolina:

Charlotte, North Carolina to Augusta, Georgia via Union and Columbia, South Carolina
Continue south at Charlotte, North Carolina:

Alternate path from Union, South Carolina to Augusta, Georgia, via Pelzer, South Carolina
Continue west from Union, South Carolina after the Broad River crossing:

See also

Interstate 81
Philadelphia and Lancaster Turnpike
U.S. Route 11
U.S. Route 30

Notes

References

 
 
 
 
 
 
 
 
 
 
 
 
 
 
 
 
 
 
 
 
 
 
 
 
 , New Link, accessed March 12, 2019
 
 
 
 
 
 
 
 
  
 
 
 
 
 
 
 
 
 
 
 
 
 
 
 
 
 
 
 
 
 
 
 
 
 
 
  
 
 
 
 
 
 
 
 
 
 
 
 
 
 
 
 *

External links
 Great Wagon Road by Charlene Mires
 The Great Wagon Road of the East (Legends of America)
 THE GREAT WAGON ROAD... (The Way We Lived in North Carolina)
 Great Wagon Road (University of South Carolina)
 The Great Wagon Road (carolana.com - J.D. Lewis)

Native American trails in the United States
Historic trails and roads in Pennsylvania
Historic trails and roads in Maryland
Historic trails and roads in Virginia
Historic trails and roads in North Carolina
Historic trails and roads in South Carolina
18th century in Pennsylvania
18th century in Maryland
18th century in Virginia
18th century in North Carolina
18th century in South Carolina
Interstate 26
U.S. Route 1
U.S. Route 11
U.S. Route 21
U.S. Route 25
U.S. Route 29
U.S. Route 30
U.S. Route 40
U.S. Route 58
U.S. Route 72
U.S. Route 76
U.S. Route 220
U.S. Route 322
Native American history of Pennsylvania
Native American history of Maryland
Native American history of Virginia
Native American history of North Carolina
Native American history of South Carolina